WARM is an international foundation working on the world’s contemporary conflicts, based in Sarajevo, Bosnia and Herzegovina.

Description 

WARM is dedicated to war reporting and war art, as well as history and memories of war, and dedicated to the promotion of emerging talents and to education. WARM works to bring together people with a common passion for "telling the story with excellence and integrity". The WARM community is an international network of reporters, artists, researchers and activists. WARM supports projects worldwide. WARM is organizing a WARM Festival and a WARM Academy every year in Sarajevo.

History 

WARM was founded during the "Sarajevo 2012" reunion of war reporters, organized on April 6, 2012, for the 20th anniversary of the war in Bosnia. The group of co-founders includes Patrick Chauvel, Ziyah Gafić, Bojan Hadžihalilović, Jon Jones, Gary Knight, Nihad Kreševljaković, Paul Lowe, Dino Mustafić, Rémy Ourdan, Mirsad Purivatra, Andrew & Atka Reid, Damir Šagolj, Velma Šarić, Vaughan Smith, Danis Tanović...

The WARM Festival started in 2014 and the WARM Academy in 2019.

Among hundreds of guests who attended the festivals, WARM produced, co-produced or supported projects by Selma Spahić, Abounaddara, Pierre Terdjman & #Dysturb, Olga Kravets - Maria Morina - Oksana Yushko, Florent Marcie, Laurent Van der Stockt, Šejla Kamerić, Moises Saman, Bernandino Hernandez, Paul Lowe, Mevludin Ekmečić, Pierre Courtin, Claudia Zini, Oscar B. Castillo, Jean-Pierre Perrin - Maral Deghati, Damir Šagolj...

Directors 
 Rémy Ourdan (2012-2019)
 Damir Šagolj (2020–present)

References

External links
 WARM website

Non-profit organizations based in Bosnia and Herzegovina
War correspondents
Culture in Sarajevo